William Holford (1862–1907) was an English footballer who played for Stoke.

Career
Holford was born in Stoke-upon-Trent and played for Boothen Victoria before joining the local professional team Stoke in 1886. He played in four matches in the FA Cup in three seasons with the club but was overlooked by manager Harry Lockett for the Football League squad and left the club in 1889.

Career statistics

References

English footballers
Stoke City F.C. players
1862 births
1907 deaths
Association football midfielders